Ethiopian liturgical chant, or Zema, is a form of Christian liturgical chant practiced by the Ethiopian Orthodox Tewahedo Church. The related musical notation is known as melekket. The tradition began after the sixth century and is traditionally identified with Saint Yared. Through history, the Ethiopian liturgical chants have undergone an evolution similar to that of European liturgical chants.

Etymology
Zema means a pleasing sound, a song or a melody in Ge'ez, the liturgical language of the Ethiopian Orthodox Tewahedo Church.

History
Saint Yared has been credited with the invention of the musical tradition of Ethiopian liturgical chants. Yared, who lived in the sixth century, represents the first known case of indigenous Ethiopian musical notation and religious music. He invented three forms of chanting. They are known as ararai, ezil and geeze. The Synaxarium of the Ethiopian Church attests that Ethiopian liturgical chants are faithful to Yared and divine in nature.

By the beginning of the sixth century, in Yared's lifetime, Ethiopia had been Christianized. Around that period, the Ethiopian Orthodox Tewahedo Church already had a corpus of prayers. Ethiopian liturgical chants were developed only after that. Deggwa, Ethiopian antiphons, in particular are of much later origin, dating from the second half of the 16th century. Most of the Ethiopian Highlands had been Miaphysite Christian since the fourth century. Ancient chanted liturgy with congregation participating with clapping, ululation and rhythmic movements has been retained from that era.

Ethiopian liturgical chants are based on both written and oral sources, but the isolation of Ethiopia and the lack of source material make it difficult to reconstruct the exact history of Ethiopian church music.

The musical notation (melekket) used for the chants, is not a typical notational system since it does not represent pitch or melody. Rather, it is as a mnemonic. Most studies conclude that there has been impressive consistency since the 1500s. It is likely that Ethiopian liturgical chants have undergone an evolution similar to that of European liturgical chants. It can be assumed that the notations have become more and more complex as time has passed. Regional varieties may have become standardized over time, and more symbols and segments of music have become available for composers.

Any form of Ethiopian gospel music was not recorded until the 1950s when priest Mere Geta Lisanework assisted the Ethiopian Radio in recording.

Practice

Students of Ethiopian liturgical chants study the Ge'ez language, and begin practicing singing in childhood. Education takes place in liturgical dance schools called aqwaqwam bét and includes, in addition to singing and dancing, training in traditional instruments such as the kebero, drums, tsanatsel, sistrum, and mequamia. Singing students (däqä mermur) become singers (däbtära) and some will eventually become masters (märigéta). A student is considered ready when he has mastered the complicated genre of qené. It has been suggested by Monneret de Villard that liturgical dance, that always accompanies the music, has its origins in the Ancient Egyptian dance.

Ethiopian Orthodox Christians form approximately 43.5% of the population of modern day Ethiopia. Ethiopian Church music remains tightly bounded within the communities and rarely attracts attention by outsiders. Ethiopian Christian music is largely sustained by communities of descent.

United States

Since the mid-1970s, large-scale emigration of Ethiopians has created a diaspora in the United States. The emigrants brought their secular and liturgical music traditions with them. There is a large concentration of qualified priests (qes) and musicians (däbtära) in Washington, D.C. However, Ethiopian Churches in smaller communities face challenges in maintaining the liturgical cycle and musical tradition.

Notational system

See also

Coptic music
Giyorgis of Segla

References

Further reading

External links
Oriental songs at www.ethiopianorthodox.org
EOTC channel on YouTube

Christian chants
Ethiopian styles of music
Yared